Ochsenknecht may refer to:

 Jimi Blue Ochsenknecht (born 1991), German actor and singer
 Natascha Ochsenknecht (born 1964), German actress
 Uwe Ochsenknecht (born 1956), German actor and singer
 Wilson Gonzalez Ochsenknecht (born 1990), German actor